Gonatoraphis is a genus of South American dwarf spiders that was first described by Alfred Frank Millidge in 1991.  it contains only three species, found in Colombia: G. aenea, G. lobata, and G. lysistrata.

See also
 List of Linyphiidae species (A–H)

References

Araneomorphae genera
Linyphiidae
Spiders of South America